Ian Kirkham (born 9 March 1963 in Preston, Lancashire) is an English saxophonist, best known for his playing with Simply Red from 1986 until the band retired in 2010. He reprised his role in the band when it reformed in 2015, and played on their 2019 album, Blue Eyed Soul. He is the second longest running member of the band, behind founder and lead vocalist Mick Hucknall. Kirkham grew up in Preston, Lancashire. He started learning piano at five, and saxophone at eleven.

References

1963 births
Living people
English rock saxophonists
British male saxophonists
Musicians from Preston, Lancashire
Simply Red members
21st-century saxophonists
21st-century British male musicians